The South Africa women's national under-20 soccer team represents South Africa in international youth women's soccer competitions.

The team competed in the women's tournament at the 2019 African Games held in Rabat, Morocco.

See also 
 South Africa women's national soccer team

References 

S
African women's national under-20 association football teams